Martin Kobau (born 11 November 1972) is an Austrian lightweight rower. He won a gold medal at the 2001 World Rowing Championships in Lucerne with the lightweight men's four.

References

1972 births
Living people
Austrian male rowers
World Rowing Championships medalists for Austria
Olympic rowers of Austria
Rowers at the 1996 Summer Olympics
Rowers at the 2000 Summer Olympics
Sportspeople from Villach